Jonathan Kuck (born March 14, 1990) is an American speed skater and silver medalist in the Winter Olympics.

At the 2010 Winter Olympics, Kuck won a silver medal in the team pursuit along with Brian Hansen and Chad Hedrick. Kuck has also won four medals at the World Championships, a silver medal at the World Allround Championships, and a silver medal at the World Junior Championships.

Personal

Kuck started speed skating when he was ten and has competed internationally since 2008. He is an alum of Countryside School and University Laboratory High School. He obtained a Bachelor of Science from the University of Illinois at Urbana–Champaign, majoring in engineering physics with a minor in computer science. He is currently pursuing a PhD in computer science at Stanford University.

Career

2014 Winter Olympics

Trials

On December 27, 2013, Kuck won the Men's 5000-meters by more than 6 seconds at the U.S. Olympic Speedskating Trials in Utah to earn a spot on the U.S. Olympic team competing in Sochi in February.

2010 Winter Olympics

Games

In the 10000 m, Kuck placed 8th with a time of 13:31.78. He was the highest American finish.

The American pursuit team consisted of Kuck, Chad Hedrick, Brian Hansen, and Trevor Marsicano. Kuck, Hedrick, and Marsicano eliminated Japan in the quarterfinal, which advanced them to face the heavily favored Netherlands in the semifinal. Kuck, Hedrick, and Hansen then beat the Dutch team by .4 seconds, with a final time of 3:42.71.

The American team were defeated by the Canadian in the gold medal final. The same trio that skated the semifinal trailed Canada in the gold medal final by as much as 0.73 seconds early in the race, trimming that margin to 0.21 at the finish with a time of 3:41.58. The Canadians hit the line at 3:41.37 to win the gold medal, leaving the American team with silver. The bronze went to the Netherlands, which set an Olympic record in the B final with a time of 3:39.95.

World Allround Championships

During the 2009- 2010 season, Kuck competed in the 1000m, 1500m 5/10,000m in World Cup events. Kuck won a silver medal at the 2010 World Allround Championships

During the 2010-11 season, Kuck consistently placed in the top 10 on the World Cup circuit. He capped the season with a World Championship title in the Team Pursuit. In November 2011, Kuck won the 3000m title at the U.S. Single Distance Championships.

Results

World Junior Championships
Kuck was the 2008 and 2009 U.S. Junior Speedskating Champion and took second overall at the 2009 World Junior Speedskating Championships.

Personal bests

Key: ‡ = National Record † = Track Record

Last updated March 2, 2010.

References

External links
 ISU profile
 Results at SpeedSkatingStats.com
 

1990 births
Living people
American male speed skaters
Speed skaters at the 2010 Winter Olympics
Speed skaters at the 2014 Winter Olympics
People from Urbana, Illinois
Olympic silver medalists for the United States in speed skating
University Laboratory High School (Urbana, Illinois) alumni
Medalists at the 2010 Winter Olympics
World Allround Speed Skating Championships medalists
World Single Distances Speed Skating Championships medalists